Highland Capital Partners is a global venture capital firm with offices in  Boston, Silicon Valley, and San Francisco. Highland has raised over $4 billion in committed capital and invested in more than 280 companies, with 47 IPOs and 134 Acquisitions.

History

Investments and Investment Funds
Highland is typically the first institutional investor in the companies they back.

From inception in 1988 to today, the firm has raised eleven venture capital funds with aggregate investor commitments of approximately $4 billion:
 1988 — Highland Capital Partners 
 1992 — Highland Capital Partners II 
 1996 — Highland Capital Partners III 
 1998 — Highland Capital Partners IV 
 2000 — Highland Capital Partners V
 2001 — Highland Capital Partners VI
 2006 — Highland Capital Partners VII 
 2009 — Highland Capital Partners VIII 
 2013 — Highland Capital Partners 9
 2018 - Highland Capital Partners 10
 2020 - Highland Capital Leaders Fund

Notable investments
The company has invested some $4 billion in more than 280 companies since its founding, including 2U, Auris Health, Bromium, Clearbanc, Everlywell, Gigamon, Imprivata LevelUp, Lululemon Athletica, Malwarebytes, Qihoo 360, Quattro Wireless, Rent the Runway, Scopely, ThredUp, Turbonomic and VistaPrint.

Current and former employees
Notable members of the team include Bob Davis, the founder of Lycos; Gaurav Tewari, the founder of Omega Venture Partners, and formerly of Highland Capital Partners;   In February 2005, Thomas G. Stemberg, the founder and former CEO of Staples, joined Highland.

Other
Highland Capital Partners is not affiliated with Highland Capital Management, the distressed investment firm, hedge fund sponsor, and mutual fund manager based in Dallas, Texas.

In November 2020, several of the senior GPs partnered with Ian Friedman, former Co-Head of Goldman Sachs Investment Partners (Venture Capital and Growth Equity Team) and formed Highland Transcend Partners I, a SPAC that targets disruptive commerce, digital media, and enterprise software. The founding team consists of Ian Friedman (CEO), Bob Davis (Executive Chairman), Dan Nova (Chief Investment Officer) and Paul Maeder (CFO)

References

The Rebirth of Venture Capitalism.  New York Times, September 24, 2006
COMPANY NEWS; STAPLES NAMES ITS CHIEF AS CHAIRMAN.  New York Times, March 12, 2005

External links
Highland Capital Partners company website

1988 establishments in Massachusetts
Venture capital firms of the United States
Companies based in Massachusetts
Financial services companies established in 1988
Private equity firms of the United States